Michael Potts (born September 21, 1962) is an American actor. He is perhaps best known for playing the roles of Brother Mouzone in The Wire, Mafala Hatimbi in the musical The Book of Mormon, and Slow Drag in Ma Rainey’s Black Bottom. He also played Detective Gilbough in the first season of True Detective.

Filmography

Film

Television

Video games

Theatre credits

References

External links

 

1962 births
Living people
American male television actors
20th-century American male actors
21st-century American male actors
Place of birth missing (living people)
American male film actors
American male stage actors
American male voice actors
American male musical theatre actors
Yale School of Drama alumni
African-American male actors